Vake may refer to:

 Vake District in Tbilisi, Georgia
 Vake, Tbilisi, a neighbourhood in Tbilisi
 Vake Park, a park in Tbilisi
 Vake (Gagra District), a village in Abkhazia, Georgia
 VAKE, the ICAO code for Kandla Airport in Gujarat, India